Use Your Brain is the second studio album by Swedish rap metal band Clawfinger, released in 1995 by MVG Records and Warner Music Group. It contains twelve tracks. Three bonus tracks were added to the 2004 re-release. Three singles and their accompanying videos were released from the album.

From Clawfinger's Facebook page: "After a lot of touring with Just D, Alice in Chains, Anthrax and others, Clawfinger went back home and wrote Use Your Brain in less than two months."

Track listing
 "Power" – 3:14
 "Pay the Bill" – 4:20
 "Pin Me Down" – 4:10
 "Waste My Time" – 3:13
 "Die High" – 2:34
 "It" – 5:21
 "Do What I Say" – 4:25
 "Undone" (feat. Freddie Wadling) – 4:11
 "What Are You Afraid Of" – 3:47
 "Back to the Basics" – 2:27
 "Easy Way Out" – 2:39
 "Tomorrow" – 4:09
 "Better Than This" – 3:36 (bonus track)
 "Three Good Riffs" – 3:56 (bonus track)
 "Armageddon Down" – 3:36 (bonus track)

Released singles
"Pin Me Down 1"
"Pin Me Down 2"
'"Do What I Say"
"Tomorrow"

Credits
Engineer – Thomas Pettersson 
Mixed by – Stefan Glaumann 
Producer – Clawfinger, Jacob Hellner

Charts

Weekly charts

Year-end charts

References

External links

Clawfinger albums
1995 albums